is a Japanese football player. She plays for Nojima Stella in the Nadeshiko Division 1 and for the Japan national team.

Club career
Oga was born in Tokyo on January 4, 1997. After graduating from Nippon Sport Science University, she joined L.League club Nojima Stella Kanagawa Sagamihara in 2019.

National team career
In February 2019, Oga was selected Japan national team for SheBelieves Cup. At this tournament, on February 27, she debuted against United States.

National team statistics

References

External links

Japan Football Association

1997 births
Living people
Nippon Sport Science University alumni
Association football people from Tokyo
Japanese women's footballers
Japan women's international footballers
Nadeshiko League players
Nojima Stella Kanagawa Sagamihara players
Women's association football defenders